Organoleptic properties are the aspects of food, water or other substances that create an individual experience via the senses—including taste, sight, smell, and touch.

USDA uses

In traditional U.S. Department of Agriculture meat and poultry inspections, inspectors perform various organoleptic procedures to detect disease or contamination. Such techniques are part of the effort to detect invisible foodborne pathogens that cause food poisoning.

Organoleptic tests are sometimes conducted to determine if food or pharmaceutical products can transfer tastes or odors to the materials and components they are packaged in.  Shelf life studies often use taste, sight, and smell (in addition to food chemistry and toxicology tests) to determine whether a food product is safe to consume.

Organoleptic analyses are, occasionally, still used when the protocol for a certain sample does not have a high enough sample throughput to meet the demand. In this case, organoleptic analyses serve as a primary screen to determine which samples must be analyzed according to the original method protocol, and which samples need no further sensory analysis.

Other examples
Measurements of pepper spiciness on the Scoville scale depend upon an organoleptic test.  The quality of extracts used in phytotherapy is assessed in part using organoleptic tests.  Organoleptic qualities are considered part of hurdle technology. Indicators identified organoleptically as part of European Union wine regulations are assessed when qualifying for a Quality Wine indicator.

Evian water claims that it should be consumed by the expiration date marked on the bottle "to take advantage of the best organoleptic quality".

References 

Sensory systems
Food safety